Thomas Charles Gillis (born July 16, 1968) is an American professional golfer.

Early life
Gillis was born in Pontiac, Michigan, and graduated from Lake Orion High School in Lake Orion, Michigan. He turned professional in 1990 after playing collegiate golf at Oakland Community College and Coastal Carolina University.

Professional career
Gillis played on the PGA Tour in 2010 after several years on the Nationwide Tour, and having previously competed on the PGA Tour in 2003 and 2005, and the European Tour from 1998 to 2002. He also played in several PGA and Nationwide Tour events during the 1990s. According to his profile, Gillis has played professional tournaments in 26 different countries.

Gillis won his first title on the Nationwide Tour at the 2009 Nationwide Tour Players Cup. He finished 5th on the money list to earn his 2010 PGA Tour card. In 2010, Gillis finished tied for fifth at the Deutsche Bank Championship. He retained his playing rights for the 2011 season, finishing 76th on the money list. He spent 2014 on the Web.com Tour, but a strong performance in the Finals earned him a place on the PGA Tour for 2015.

His best career finishes are a tie for second at the 2012 Honda Classic and a playoff loss to Jordan Spieth at the 2015 John Deere Classic.

In between the time of playing on the PGA Tour, and switching to the PGA Tour Champions, Gillis spent a year coaching high school golf. He coached the varsity team at Pontiac Notre Dame Prep. In 2018, Gillis began playing on the PGA Tour Champions. In his first event, the 3M Championship, he shot 67-67-67 to finish in a tie for 3rd.

Professional wins (5)

Nationwide Tour wins (1)

Other wins (4)
 1992 Waterloo Open Golf Classic
 1993 Jamaican Open
 1994 Michigan Open
 2008 Michigan Open

Playoff record
PGA Tour playoff record (0–1)

Results in major championships

CUT = missed the half-way cut
WD = Withdrew
"T" = tied
Note: Gillis never played in the Masters Tournament.

Results in The Players Championship

CUT = missed the half-way cut
"T" = tied

Results in senior major championships

"T" indicates a tie for a place
WD = withdrew
NT = No tournament due to COVID-19 pandemic

See also
 2002 PGA Tour Qualifying School graduates
 2004 PGA Tour Qualifying School graduates
 2009 Nationwide Tour graduates
 2014 Web.com Tour Finals graduates

References

External links

American male golfers
Coastal Carolina Chanticleers men's golfers
PGA Tour golfers
European Tour golfers
Korn Ferry Tour graduates
Golfers from Michigan
Sportspeople from Pontiac, Michigan
People from Lake Orion, Michigan
1968 births
Living people